The Adelaide Adrenaline is a semi-professional ice hockey team based in Adelaide, South Australia. The team is a member of the Australian Ice Hockey League (AIHL). The team was founded in 2008 as the Adelaide A's to replace the defunct Adelaide Avalanche who folded mid-season. The team plays its home games at the IceArenA, located in the suburb of Thebarton. The Adrenaline are one time Goodall Cup champions from 2009.

History

The team was formed at the start of July 2008 to replace the Adelaide Avalanche after they folded in June. In a deal with the AIHL the A's picked up the Avalanche's team list and fulfilled the existing game schedule for the remainder of the 2008 season. After the 2008 season the A's were renamed the Adelaide Adrenaline for the upcoming 2009 season. The Adrenaline's best result in the regular season came in the 2012 season when they finished second in their conference and second overall. The team have qualified for the playoffs on four occasions, winning the Goodall Cup in 2009 and finishing runners-up in 2010.

The 2009 season saw the newly named Adrenaline perform strongly in the regular season. Adelaide won 16 of 24 matches and finished third in the league table, qualifying for the finals weekend in Newcastle. 29 August 2009, the Adrenaline played the Melbourne Ice in the semi-final at the Hunter Ice Skating Stadium. Adelaide took an early lead in the first period thanks to a Sami Mantere goal and never looked back from that point. The Adrenaline ended up winning the match 6–1 with Sami Mantere, Jeremy Beirnes and Mike Werner all scoring braces. 30 August 2009, the Adrenaline came up against the Newcastle North Stars in the AIHL Championship final in front of 950 people. It was a match where power plays provided the opportunities to break down stubborn defences with three of the four goals scored during regulation time coming with a man advantage. After a scoreless third period the two teams could not be separated on 2-2 and the match advanced to overtime. Cassian Delsar stepped up and scored the winner in overtime to claim the Adrenaline's first ever title and the finals MVP. Adelaide was presented with the brand new H Newman Reid Trophy for winning the AIHL Championship. The trophy replaced the Goodall Cup, which had been withdrawn from the competition before the start of the season. The Goodall Cup returned the following season and the Adrenaline championship title win was backdated and Adelaide was awarded the Cup. The H Newman Reid Trophy became the premiership title prize instead.

In the 2010 season, the Adrenaline again reached the AIHL finals weekend by finishing fourth in the league standings. Adelaide drew the North Stars in the semi-finals in a reply of the previous season's final. In a vastly different kind of match compared to the final in 2009, the Adrenaline outshot the North Stars to beat Newcastle 7-6 to reach their second Goodall Cup final in a row. In the final Adelaide come up against home team, the Melbourne Ice. In front of a packed Melbourne Icehouse, Adelaide put up a good performance but ultimately fell short and lost the final 4–6.

Ahead of the 2017 season, the Adrenaline announced a club re-brand with a new logo, uniform and digital design and assets. The re-brand was released with a new team hashtag ‘#OneBeat’. The new logo was a stylised ‘A’ shaped by a heartbeat line presentation. In addition to the new primary logo, the Adrenaline revealed a new secondary logo to be used as shoulder patches on jerseys. The circular badge features the South Australian piping shrike emblematic bird at its heart on a white background. Surrounding piping shrike is the team name in full ‘Adelaide Adrenaline Ice Hockey Club’ on a navy background. The emblem is boarded by a red and yellow border to complete the team’s entire colour palette. The new kits kept the traditional primary blue home colour and white away.

On 13 May 2018, Adelaide, AIHL and Australian ice hockey legend, Greg Oddy announced his retirement. Over the course of 19 years Oddy became a superstar of the local game. Upon his retirement, Oddy held four AIHL all-time records for appearances (615), goals (268), assists (347) and points (615). Greg held the points record for the Australian national team (118). Oddy was a leader for the Adrenaline and Adelaide Avalanche. He captained both teams for 11 seasons combined (2005-2016). He won 3 Goodall Cups (2 with the Avalanche and 1 with the Adrenaline) and 3 gold medals with the national team. Oddy was Adelaide's last remaining foundation player still playing in 2018. Oddy's family built the Adrenaline and Avalanche teams and his contribution to South Australian hockey, the AIHL, the national team and the Adrenaline will not be forgotten.

On 11 January 2020, The Adrenaline announced former player and head coach Sami Mantere had been re-appointed as head coach for the 2020 season. Sami replaced outgoing head coach, Jim Fuyarchuk, who held the position for the last two seasons. However, due to the postponement and eventual cancellation of the 2020 AIHL season, Sami was never in charge of a game in his second stint as Adrenaline head coach. The 2021 season followed 2020 in being cancelled by the AIHL, the Adrenaline went a second year without playing a game.

During the two season hiatus, in October 2021, the AIHL began an expression of interest process to find a new licensee for the Adelaide Adrenaline license, following former holders, the South Australian Ice Sports Federation, relinquishing the license at the conclusion of the 2019 season. The process took five months, and in February 2022 the new license holder was announced as Benny Gebert and Glen Foll. Foll and Gebert were then appointed directors of the club and took on the roles of Hockey Operations Manager and Club Operations Manager respectfully.

The Adrenaline were all ready to return to the ice in 2022 following the announcement of the 2022 AIHL season going ahead in December 2021. Games were slated for the Adrenaline in the official schedule release by the league in February 2022. However, the Adrenaline made it publicly known that they were locked in ongoing negotiations with the new management of the Adelaide IceArenA and had not yet secured an ice time agreement for games and training. The IceArenA management released a signed letter making public a list of grievances with the AIHL and stated it would be difficult for the venue to support the league. On 20 March 2022, the Adrenaline rejected the IceArenA’s offer, stating the offer was both unviable and non-equitable. Following the collapse of the negotiation process and due to a lack of alternative rink facility options in South Australia, the Adrenaline confirmed the team would withdraw from the 2022 AIHL season and hoped to return to action in 2023.

In 2023, ahead of the 2023 AIHL season the Adelaide Adrenaline released an updated version of their team logo with a modified colour scheme. The team's colours changed from navy blue, yellow, white and red to dark blue, red, gold and black. The new colour scheme brings the Adrenaline into line with two other Adelaide based sporting teams, baseball team Adelaide Giants and basketball team Adelaide 36ers. The logo promoted the colour red to become more prominent with the font changing, while the positioning of Adelaide and Adrenaline was switched.

Season-by-season results

1 In a deal with the AIHL, previous games results and statistcs for the Adelaide Avalanche were carried over to the A's for the 2008 season.
2 Despite there being no ties in the AIHL, since the introduction of the shootout in 2006, the Adrenaline were awarded two ties against the Brave and Bears for game cancellations due to a bus crash involving the traveling Adrenaline players and coaching staff en route to Canberra.

Championships
Goodall Cup 
 Champions (1): 2009
 Runners-Up (1): 2010

H Newman Reid Trophy (replaced the V.I.P. Cup)
 Premiers (0): 
 Runners-Up (1): 2012

Players

Current roster

Team roster for the 2019 AIHL season

Retired numbers

Throughout the history of the Adrenaline, one jersey number has been retired in honour of a former club legend. The Adrenaline has already indicated they will retire Greg Oddy's jersey in the future.

Player records

All-time totals

These are the top-ten all-time player records in franchise history for the following categories: Appearances, Goals, Assists, Points, Penalty minutes
 (Figures are updated after each completed AIHL regular season)

Legend:

By season totals

These are the top-ten season by season all-time player records in franchise history for the following categories: Points, Penalty minutes and Save Percentage
 (Figures are updated after each completed AIHL regular season)

Team Staff
Current as of 2019 AIHL season

Source:

Leaders

Team captains
The Adrenaline have had three captains in the team's history.

References:

Head coaches
The Adrenaline have had six head coaches in the team's history.

References:

Broadcasting
Current:
 Kayo Sports (2022 - present) – Domestic online video broadcasting in Australia as part of the league wide deal struck in the lead up to the 2022 AIHL season to show every AIHL game live. ATC Productions producing the streams.
 Sportradar (2022 - present) – International online video broadcasting in North America and Europe as part of a league-wide 3-year deal signed in March 2022 in the lead up to the 2022 AIHL season.

Former:
 Fox Sports (2013 – 2019) – Part of the entire AIHL domestic TV broadcasting deal with Fox Sports to show one game a round, normally on Thursday's at 4:30 pm or after NHL games during NHL season.
 Self-broadcast (2016–2019) – Between 2016 and 2019 the Adelaide Adrenaline self-broadcast all home matches with an online audio stream utilising the Mixlr platform.

References

External links

Adelaide Adrenaline Official Website
Adelaide Adrenaline Facebook
Adelaide Adrenaline Twitter
AIHL Official Website

Australian Ice Hockey League teams
Ice hockey teams in Australia
Ice hockey clubs established in 2008
Sporting clubs in Adelaide
2008 establishments in Australia